Michel Boulos (born March 24, 1976) is a Canadian sabre fencer. He competed in the men's sabre event at the 2004 Summer Olympics. He was also part of the team that won gold in the sabre event at the 1999 Pan American Games, as well as winning silver at the 2007 Pan American Games, and two bronze medals.

References

External links
 

1976 births
Living people
Canadian male fencers
Olympic fencers of Canada
Fencers at the 2003 Pan American Games
Fencers at the 2004 Summer Olympics
Fencers from Montreal
Pan American Games medalists in fencing
Pan American Games bronze medalists for Canada
Pan American Games silver medalists for Canada
Pan American Games gold medalists for Canada
Medalists at the 2003 Pan American Games